Downtime is a 1997 British film directed by Bharat Nalluri and produced by Richard L. Johns. It stars Paul McGann and Susan Lynch.

Plot
Former police psychologist Rob helps to save a young woman, Chrissy, when she is about to commit suicide by jumping off a 21st-storey balcony with her 4-year-old son, Jake. When he persuades her to go on a date, they are trapped with Jake and a neighbour called Pat in a lift because a drunken gang crashed into its engine room.

External links

References

1997 films
Films directed by Bharat Nalluri
Films scored by Simon Boswell
British independent films
1997 directorial debut films
1990s British films